Bavayia ashleyi is a species of geckos endemic to New Caledonia.

There are two known populations of this species, on the island of Grande Terre, with a total remaining area of occurrence estimated at 50 sq km. This habitat is at risk from wildfires and nickel mining. Its habitat is also at risk of degradation by deer and pigs that have been introduced.

References

Bavayia
Reptiles described in 2022
Taxa named by Aaron M. Bauer
Taxa named by Ross Allen Sadlier
Taxa named by Todd R. Jackman
Geckos of New Caledonia